UAE Third Division League is the fourth tier of football league competition in the United Arab Emirates, the league is organised by UAE Football Association for private funded clubs. The league was established for the 2021–22 season. 12 teams participated in the first edition, divided in two groups of six. On 6 July 2022, UAEFA announced that the number of participants will increase from 12 to 16 teams for the 2022–23 season, an increase of 4 teams from the 2021–22 season.

Current teams 
As of 2022–23 UAE Third Division League

 Note: Table lists clubs in alphabetical order

Competition format 
The 2021–22 edition featured 12 teams in two groups that competed in a round robin league format of home and away game. The top two teams from each group would then qualify into a semi-final, in which the winner of group Group A would face the runner-up of group B, and vice versa. The semi-finals would take place over two legs (home and away). The winners of the semi-finals would secure promotion to the UAE Second Division and a place in the UAE Third Division final.

List of champions 

 2021–22: Gulf United

Performance by club

Performance by city

References

External links
UAE FA Official website 

Football leagues in the United Arab Emirates
Fourth level football leagues in Asia